Saint Aedesius of Alexandria (also Edese or Edesius) (died 306) was an early Christian martyred under Galerius Maximianus. He was the brother of Saint Aphian (or Amphianus). According to the martyrology, he publicly rebuked a judge who had been forcing Christian virgins to work in brothels in order to break them of their faith, so he was tortured and drowned.

Life and martyrdom

Western tradition

The historian Eusebius of Caesarea elaborates Aedesius' story: like his brother, he was a philosopher that converted to Christianity. Perhaps because of his standing among the educated, he seems to have thought little of professing his faith before magistrates, for which he was imprisoned several times and was sentenced to work in the mines of Palestine. He sought solitude in Egypt after his release, but found the persecution there was harsher under Hierocles. Aedesius was offended by the enslavement of consecrated virgins (who were forced to work in brothels), and so presented himself before the governor, whereupon he was seized by soldiers, tortured, and drowned. The saint's acta are preserved in a Chaldaic text. This story is probably confused, and perhaps conflated with that of the contemporary Neoplatonist philosopher, Aedesius.

Eastern tradition
The account of the Eastern Church says Aedesius and his brother were born in Patara of high-standing pagan parents. The brothers converted while studying in Beirut, secretly fleeing to Caesarea to be taught by a priest named Pamphylus. It is reported that Amphianus  gave himself up to martyrdom, having "a twenty-year-old body but the understanding and greatness of soul of a centenarian." Having tried to stop the pagan governor of the area from sacrificing to idols, he was tortured; his legs were wrapped in cotton and burned, and they threw him into the sea with a stone around his neck. Aedesius was punished by being sent to a copper mine in Palestine, and then to Egypt. In Alexandria, he spoke out against Hierocles, who had been forcing Christian "nuns, virgins and pious women" to work alongside prostitutes in brothels. The account says Aedesius struck the prince, for which he was tortured and drowned in the sea like his brother.

Veneration
Aedesius' feast day is celebrated on 8 April in the Roman Catholic Church. In Eastern Orthodox Churches, his feast is 2 April.

In art, Aedesius is shown shipwrecked with his brother; the mention of a depiction that has his legs wrapped in oiled linen before he is burned to death is probably a reflection of the Eastern story of his brother's martyrdom.

Notes and references

External links
Catholic Online profile

306 deaths
Saints from Roman Anatolia
4th-century Christian martyrs
4th-century Romans
Year of birth unknown